Yatariabad or Yateriabad may refer to:
 Yatariabad-e Olya
 Yateriabad-e Sofla